Fernando Galvez Gómez (born 23 January 1990), known artistically as Yung Beef, is a Spanish singer, rapper, record producer and model. He is known for his mixing of trap, salsa and reggaeton, as well as his bold fashion sense.

Career 
He began to become popular as a member of the extinct PXXR GVNG (today Los Santos), which was the first trap collective to sign with a multinational, but now he runs his own record label, La Vendición. He later gained popularity in the Spanish rap scene with his acclaimed mixtape A.D.R.O.M.I.C.F.M.S., with productions by Steve Lean, 808 Mafia and the Galician duo Lowlight.

In March 2017, Yung Beef and a number of other international artists were denied entrance into the U.S. and unable to perform at the South by Southwest music festival.

In the summer of 2018, he landed a Calvin Klein campaign and modelled for Hood By Air during Paris Fashion Week.

Partial discography

Mixtapes 
 A.D.R.O.M.I.C.F.M.S. 1 (2013)
 #Freemolly (with Steve Lean) (2014)
 Trunks Future Bricks (2015)
 Perreo de la Muerte (2015)
 A.D.R.O.M.I.C.F.M.S. 2 (with Steve Lean) (2015)
 Fashion Mixtape (2016)
 La Última Cena (with Fly Migo Bankroll) (2016)
 Kowloon Mixtape (2017)
 ADROMICFMS 4 (2018)
 El Plugg Mixtape (2018)
 Traumatismo Kraneoencefálico (with Goa) (2018)
 Perreo de la Muerte 2 (2019)
 Perreo de la Muerte 2.5 (2020)
 Shishi Plugg (2020)
 Lágrimas (2020)
 Sonrisas (2020)
 El Plugg 2 (2021)
 Gangster Original (2021)

Greatest hits albums 
 Grandes Clásicos (2018)

Tracks 
 Dinero De La Ola (for Mixtape Volume 1 by Neymar Jr. and Nike)

References 

Living people
1990 births
Spanish male rappers